The North American Butterfly Association (NABA) was created in 1992 by Jeffrey Glassberg who is the association's president. The NABA was formed in order to promote awareness of butterfly conservation and the benefits of butterfly gardening, observation, photography and education. 

As with the National Audubon Society and the Christmas Bird Count, the NABA holds annual volunteer butterfly counts in the weeks leading up to or after July 4 in the United States, July 1 in Canada, and September 16 in Mexico. Volunteers scout out a meeting place and map out a 15 mile circle in which they count all the butterflies they see in one day. These counts give clues into the butterfly biodiversity of a particular region. 

The North American Butterfly Association also publishes the American Butterflies magazine quarterly. The magazine is currently 48 pages long and includes color photographs and articles on butterfly "hot spots", identification, gardening, photography, book reviews and regular features and columns.

External links 
Official site
NABA South Texas Chapter site

See also
Butterfly Conservation (UK group)
  St. Louis Chapter of the North American Butterfly Association 

Butterfly organizations
Nature conservation organizations based in the United States
Environmental organizations based in New Jersey